Roberto Malotti is an Italian football manager who is last known to have managed Montevarchi.

Career

In 2015, Malotti was appointed manager of Italian fourth tier side Sangiovannese but left to prioritize his restaurant business. In 2016, he was appointed manager of Prato.

In 2021, Malotti was appointed manager of Italian fourth tier club Montevarchi, helping them earn promotion to the Italain third tier.

References

A.C. Prato managers
Italian football managers
Italian footballers
Living people
Montevarchi Calcio Aquila 1902 managers
Serie C managers
Serie D managers
Year of birth missing (living people)